O'Connell Bridge is a road bridge spanning the River Liffey in Dublin, Ireland, which joins O'Connell Street to D'Olier Street, Westmoreland Street and the south quays.

History
The original bridge (named Carlisle Bridge for the then Lord Lieutenant of Ireland – Frederick Howard, 5th Earl of Carlisle) was designed by James Gandon, and built between 1791 and 1794.

Originally humped, and narrower, Carlisle bridge was a symmetrical, three semicircular arch structure constructed in granite with a Portland stone balustrade and obelisks on each of the four corners.  A keystone head at the apex of the central span symbolises the River Liffey, corresponding to the heads on the Custom House (also designed by James Gandon) which personify the other great rivers of Ireland.

Between 1877 and 1880 the bridge was reconstructed and widened.

When the bridge was reopened c.1882 it was renamed for Daniel O'Connell when the statue in his honour was unveiled.

In recent years, the lamps that graced the central island have been restored to their five lantern glory. In 2004, a pair of pranksters installed a plaque on the bridge dedicated to Father Pat Noise, which remained unnoticed until May 2006, and was still there as of June 2020.

In popular culture
The bridge is the setting of Liam O'Flaherty's short story, The Sniper, and is also referenced in several other works, including James Joyce's novel, Ulysses.

Arthur Fields, locally known as The Man on The Bridge, took more than 182,000 photographs of pedestrians on the bridge from the 1930s to the 1980s.

Notes

References

Bridges in Dublin (city)
Bridges completed in 1794
O'Connell family
1794 establishments in Ireland